The Pinnaroo Line serviced the agricultural districts of the Mallee in the Australian states of South Australia and Victoria for the freight of grain, although there were periods of passenger travel on the line in previous years (the last passenger service between Ouyen in Victoria and Pinnaroo in South Australia being in 1968).

The railway line was the means to open up the agricultural lands with the supply of goods and services from rural centres sustaining the remote area. It was completed from Ouyen to Murrayville in 1912 and extended to Pinnaroo in 1915. In 1996 The line stopped at Panitya due to gauge conversion at the state border when the South Australian end was converted to standard gauge. It was booked out of service on 4 October 2007.

As part of the Murray Basin Rail Project, the line from Ouyen to Murrayville was upgraded to 19 tonnes axle loading and converted to standard gauge in 2018.

References 

Railway lines in Victoria (Australia)
Standard gauge railways in Australia